Lonely Woman is an album by American jazz group the Modern Jazz Quartet featuring performances recorded in 1962 and released on the Atlantic label.

Reception
The Allmusic review called the album "one of the band's best efforts... A great disc that's perfect for the curious jazz lover".

Track listing
All compositions by John Lewis except as indicated
 "Lonely Woman" (Ornette Coleman) - 6:20 
 "Animal Dance" - 4:05 
 "New York 19" - 7:59 
 "Belkis" - 3:43 
 "Why Are You Blue?" (Gary McFarland) - 6:34 
 "Fugato" - 2:48 
 "Lamb, Leopard (If I Were Eve)" - 6:25 
 "Trieste" - 5:43

Personnel
Milt Jackson - vibraphone
John Lewis - piano
Percy Heath - bass
Connie Kay - drums

References

Atlantic Records albums
Modern Jazz Quartet albums
Albums produced by Nesuhi Ertegun
1962 albums